The Florida Cup (also known as the state championship of Florida) is the annual American football rivalry between the University of Florida Gators, Florida State University Seminoles and the University of Miami Hurricanes.

Along with the Commander-in-Chief's Trophy (given to the winner of the round robin between Army, Navy and Air Force), the Beehive Boot (a round-robin between all of the FBS teams in Utah; Utah, Utah State and BYU) and the Michigan MAC Trophy (Central Michigan, Eastern Michigan and Western Michigan), the Florida Cup is one of the very few three-way college football rivalries that presents a trophy to the winner. However, it is unique in that it is the only three-way rivalry consisting of three Power Five conference teams with a trophy at stake.

History of the trophy
The trophy originated in 2002 by the Florida Sports Foundation, the official sports promotion and development organization of the state of Florida, and the Florida Championships Awards, Inc., is sponsored by the state of Florida given to either Florida State University, University of Florida or University of Miami for winning a round-robin against the other two teams in the same season (including bowl games if necessary). The idea of finally having a trophy for the round robin winner between the three schools was enthusiastically endorsed by then-governor Jeb Bush.

Trophy design
The trophy was created by the Baldwin Hardware Corporation. It is designed to be a unique piece of art as well as representative of the traditional power of Florida's major collegiate football teams. The base is crafted from solid cherry with the outline of the State of Florida and the football at the top in gold-plated solid pewter. The football is mounted on three curved, swirling "pillars" made from silver-plated solid brass that represent the state's three powerhouse football programs—the University of Miami, Florida State University, and the University of Florida.

Conference affiliations and game scheduling

The rivalry between the three schools has traditionally been non-conference; it was only in 2004 that Miami moved to the Atlantic Coast Conference (ACC), joining Florida State, which played its first season as a member of the ACC in 1992. Prior to this move, Miami was in the Big East Conference, which it joined in 1991. Before joining their respective conferences, both teams had been independent. Florida has been in their conference, the Southeastern Conference (SEC), for much longer, having been one of its charter members in 1932.

Although Florida State has played both Miami and Florida annually for roughly 50 years, Florida has not played Miami in an annual series since 1987. The Florida Cup has been awarded to the winner of the round-robin between the three Florida schools since 2002. Thus, the cup can only be awarded during years in which all three teams play against one another. Florida State defeated both Miami and Florida in 2010, 2011, 2013, 2014, 2015,2016, and 2022, but was denied six additional Florida Cups because Florida and Miami did not play each other those years. The cup has been given only six times.

Miami won the first three Florida Cups awarded, having played Florida in the 2002 and 2003 regular seasons, and the 2004 Peach Bowl. Florida won its first Florida Cup in 2008, and Florida State won the 2013 Florida Cup with wins over Florida and Miami in the regular season. Florida won the most recent Florida Cup in 2019, having beaten Miami in the Camping World Kickoff and defeating Florida State in the regular season finale.

Future Cup years

As Florida and Miami do not play every season, the trophy is only up for grabs on years when the two schools meet. Florida and Miami are slated to meet in Gainesville in 2024 and in Miami in 2025, so the Cup will be on the table in those years as well. However, 2025 will be the last year the Florida Cup is awarded for the foreseeable future (unless Florida and Miami are paired together in a bowl game), since Florida and Miami must play each other in order for the Cup to be handed out.

Tiebreaking procedures

Three way tie

Should the three way rivalry end in a tie (if Florida, Florida State and Miami all go 1–1 against the other two schools), the trophy would then go to the team that allows the fewest total points against the other two. If all three teams beat each other, and two of the three schools have given up the same number of points (and that number of points is lower than the number of points allowed by the third school) then the trophy goes to the school that won the head-to-head matchup with the other team it is tied with.

Should all three teams have given up the same number of points in the games against each other, the trophy then goes to the team that scored the most points against the two teams.

If that number is also tied (and the only way that this is possible is if all three teams won one game and lost the other game by exactly the same score), then, the award is officially shared between the three schools, and all three schools receive official recognition as state champion; however, the previous winner retains possession of the trophy until the next season in which it is awarded.

Split Match-ups

Should two teams play each other multiple times in the same season (in the case of Florida and Florida State or Florida and Miami, first in the regular season and then again in a bowl game, or in the case of Florida State and Miami, first in the regular season and then again in the ACC Championship Game or in a bowl game) and the two teams split the match ups, the school that amasses the better combined score against that opponent in those two match ups gets recognized as the winner between those two schools in the round robin standings among the three schools. Should the two schools beat each other by the same margin in the two games, the team that surrendered fewer total points in the two match ups against that opponent is recognized as the winner, and if the two schools beat each other by the same final score, the team with the greater margin of victory over the third team in the rivalry receives recognition as the winner.

If all the above criteria are still tied in the case of teams meeting multiple times in a season, the award is shared between those schools, and both schools receive official recognition as the state champion. However, the school among the two that are tied that most recently won the award outright retains possession of the trophy.

Results table

1958–2001

2002–present

Notes
Two meetings have come in bowl games, Florida State vs. Miami in the * 2004 Orange Bowl (2003 season) and Florida vs. Miami in the ↑ December 2004 Peach Bowl

See also 

 Florida–Florida State football rivalry
 Florida–Miami football rivalry
 Florida State–Miami football rivalry

References 

College football rivalry trophies in the United States
Miami Hurricanes football
Florida Gators football
Florida State Seminoles football
2002 establishments in Florida
Sports rivalries in Florida